The Bishop of Reykjavík is the head of the Roman Catholic Diocese of Reykjavík, part of the Catholic church in Iceland.

The Norsemen who settled in Iceland from the end of the ninth century  worshipped the Æsir (the Norse gods). The country converted about 999. 

In 1056, the country was given a bishop of its own, suffragan to the Archbishop of Hamburg, with his see at Skálholt, while in 1106 a bishopric was established at Hólar. These two dioceses were first under the Archbishop of Lund, later (1152) under that of Trondheim, and until the middle of the 16th century were in close communion with Rome. 

The bishops were selected by the Alþingi, but the nominees were consecrated by the metropolitan. Many of their prelates were distinguished for their virtue and wisdom. The priests of Iceland frequently went to French and English universities for studies. Many among the clergy and laity made pilgrimages to shrines of both East and West. Canon law was in force by the year 1053. Under the influence of the Church the old laws (Grágás) were written down in 1117, but civil strife led to recognition of Norwegian hegemony. 

Upon the death of Haakon VI of Norway in 1380, his son Olaf, who since 1376 had ruled Denmark, ascended the Norwegian throne and thus effected a centuries-long union of Denmark and Iceland, which later facilitated the spread of Lutheranism during the Reformation. The Althing (Icelandic parliament) was not suppressed until 1800.

Catholic Bishops
The following most recent heads of the Catholic Church in Iceland were bishops:

Vicars Apostolic of Iceland
Martino Meulenberg S.M.M., June 12, 1923 - 1941 (died);
Jóhannes Gunnarsson S.M.M., February 23, 1942 - 1967 (resigned);

Bishops of Reykjavík 
 Hendrik Hubert Frehen S.M.M., October 18, 1968 - October 31, 1986 (died)
Alfred James Jolson, S.J. December 12, 1987 - March 21, 1994 (died)
Joannes Baptist Matthijs Gijsen, May 24, 1996 -  October 30, 2007 (retired)
Pierre Bürcher, December 15, 2007 - September 18, 2015 (retired)
Dávid Bartimej Tencer, OFMCap, September 18, 2015 - onwards

Footnotes

Sources

See also

See also
Christ the King Cathedral, Reykjavík (Iceland)
Roman Catholicism in Iceland
Christianity in Iceland

External links
Roman Catholic Diocese of Reykjavík 
Catholic-Hierarchy: Reykjavik (Diocese)

Catholic Church in Iceland
 
History of Christianity in Iceland